Kaspar Eberhard (21 March 1523 – 20 October 1575) was a German Lutheran theologian and teacher. He was born at Schneeberg, and died at Wittenberg.

Life

Bibliography 
 Walter Friedensburg: Geschichte der Universität Wittenberg. Max Niemeyer, Halle (Saale) 1917,
 Irene Dingel, Günther Wartenberg: Die Theologische Fakultät Wittenberg 1502 bis 1602, Leipzig 2002, 
 Archiv für Reformationsgeschichte (ARG) Jahrgang 29, Leipzig 1932, S. 97-132
 Archiv für Reformationsgeschichte (ARG) Jahrgang 30, Leipzig 1933, S. 43
 Archiv für Reformationsgeschichte (ARG) Jahrgang 31, Leipzig 1934, S. 57
 Archiv für Reformationsgeschichte (ARG) Jahrgang 34, Leipzig 1937, S. 167-169
 Christian Gottlieb Jöcher: Allgemeines Gelehrten–Lexikon. 2. Teil, Leipzig 1750
 Balthasar Mencii: Historica Narratio, de Septem Electoribus..., Frankfurt 1577 S. 129
 Hans Peter Hasse: Zensur theologischer Bücher in Kursachsen im konfessionellen Zeitalter, 2000
 Georg Loesche:Johannes Mathesius-Ein Lebens- und Sitten-Bild aus der Reformationszeit. Bd. I, S. 183–185, Gotha, Perthes 1895 und 1971
 Heinz Scheible (Hrsg.): Melanchthons Briefwechsel. Kritische und kommentierte Gesamtausgabe. Band 11: Personen. Teil: A - E. Frommann-Holzboog, Stuttgart u. a. 2003, .
 Insa Christine Hennen: Fürbilde der Herde - Johannes Bugenhagen und seine Wittenberger Nachfolger, Ausstellungskatalog des Bugenhagenhauses in der Lutherstadt Wittenberg, Wittenberg Leipzig 2007
 Veronika Albrecht Birkner: Pfarrerbuch der Kirchenprovinz Sachsen. Evangelische Verlagsanstalt, Leipzig, 2004, Bd. 2, S. 389  
 Helmar Junghans: Verzeichnis der Rektoren, Prorektoren, Dekane, Professoren und Schloßkirchenprediger der Leucorea vom Sommersemester 1536 bis zum Wintersemester 1574/75. In: Irene Dingel, Günther Wartenberg: Georg Major (1502–1574) - Ein Theologe der Wittenberger Reformation. Evangelische Verlagsanstalt, Leipzig, 2005, 

1523 births
1575 deaths
People from Schneeberg, Saxony
German Lutheran theologians
Clergy from Saxony
German male non-fiction writers
16th-century German Protestant theologians
16th-century German male writers
Academic staff of the University of Wittenberg